Eric Chang may refer to:

Eric Chang (pastor) (1934–2013), Hong Kong pastor
Eric Chang (politician) (born 1979), Belizean politician born in Taiwan
Eric Chang (photographer) (born 1990), Indonesian film director and photographer based in the United States

See also
Eric Chan (born 1959), Hong Kong civil servant
Eric Cheng (born 1975), American entrepreneur